Uttam Kumar (born Arun Kumar Chattopadhyay; 3 September 1926 – 24 July 1980), popularly known as the Mahanayak, was an Indian actor, producer, director, script writer, composer, and singer who predominantly worked in Bengali cinema. Kumar was one of the most successful actors in Bengali cinema history.

Kumar's career spanned three decades, from the late 1940s until his death in 1980. He appeared in over 200 films. Some of his best known films are Agni Pariksha, Harano Sur, Bicharak, Saptapadi, Jhinder Bandi, Sesh Anka, Deya Neya, Lal Pathore, Jatu Griha, Thana Theke Aschi, Chowringhee, Nayak, Antony Firingee, Amanush, Bagh Bondi Khela and Chiriyakhana (1967).

Early life
Arun Kumar Chattopadhyay was born on 3 September 1926 at a maternal home in Ahiritola in northern Calcutta. His father was Satkari Chattopadhyay and his mother was Chapla Devi. He was from a middle class family. He had two brothers, Barun Kumar and Tarun Kumar. His younger brother Tarun Kumar was also an actor. The nickname "Uttam" was given to him by his maternal grandmother.

Kumar was admitted to Chakraberia High School and later entered South Suburban School (Main) where he passed matriculation. While in school, he led a theatre group called "Lunar Club". Kumar's first role was in Rabindranath Tagore's Mukut. At the age of ten, he won a trophy for his role in the play. He joined Goenka College of Commerce and Business Administration for his higher studies, but was unable to complete this education because of the financial difficulties his family was facing. Then he joined Kolkata Port Trust as a clerk, where he got paid 75 rupees per month.

He learned singing from Nidanbandhu Banerjee. He learned Lathi Khela and practiced wrestling. He became a champion in swimming at Bhawanipur Swimming Association three years in a row. His family owned an amateur theatre group called Suhrid Samaj.

Career

Early film career
Kumar entered the film industry in 1947, appearing as an extra in the Hindi film Mayadore, which was never released. His first released film was the 1948 film Drishtidan, directed by Nitin Bose and starring Asit Baran. The next year, he appeared as the hero in the film Kamona, changing his name again to Uttam Chatterjee. Later he changed his name again to Arun Kumar. The 1951 film Sahajatri was the first in which he used the name Uttam Kumar, at the advice of Pahari Sanyal. Many of Kumar's early films were flops, and he was nicknamed "Flop Master General".

In 1952, Kumar had a supporting role in Basu Poribar, directed by Nirmal Dey, which was his first role to receive praise. The following year, he worked with the same studio and director in the film Sharey Chuattor, which was his first time paired with Suchitra Sen. His first breakthrough role was in Agradoot's film Agnipariksha in 1954.

Collaboration with Satyajit Ray
Satyajit Ray originally approached Kumar to appear in his film Ghare Baire, which he wrote in 1956. Ray approached Kumar to appear as the role of Sandip, but Kumar refused, believing the role would be better for an established actor. Ray completed the film in 1984, after Kumar's death, casting Soumitra Chatterjee for the role.

Kumar collaborated with Ray  for the first time in 1966 on the film Nayak. After seeing Kumar in Nayak, actress Elizabeth Taylor was impressed with his performance and wanted to work and meet with him.

In 1967, Kumar worked with Ray in Chiriyakhana. When the Government of India instituted National Film Awards, Kumar was the first actor to be honored with the National Award for Best Actor at the 15th National Film Awards in 1968 for his performances in Chiriyakhana and Anthony Firingee.

Producing and directing
Kumar produced six Bengali films and one Hindi film. The first films he produced, Harano Sur (1957) and Saptapadi, were under the banner of Alochayas Production. Both films were directed by Ajoy Kar and received the National Film Award. In 1963, he changed the name of his production house to Uttam Kumar Films Private L.T.D. The first film produced under this banner was produced Bhranti Bilash, which was followed by Uttar Falguni, Jatu griha, and Grihadaha.

Later, Kumar also directed the films Sudhu Ekti Bochhor, Bon Palashir Padaboli, and Kalankini Kankabati (released after his death).

He composed music for the film Kaal Tumi Aleya, in which Hemanta Mukherjee and Asha Bhosle sang. and also composed Sabyasachi (1977). He was also a playback singer in his own film Nabajanma (1956). Later he also made a recording singing Rabindra Sangeet. He first sang in the 1950 film Maryada.

Theatre
Kumar acted in theatre before debuting in the film industry. In 1953, he returned to theater, acting in a play called "Shyamali" under the Star Theater banner. Shyamali ran for over 480 nights. The director Ajoy Kar made a film based on the play with the same title, Shyamali. In the 1970s, Kumar directed plays under the organization, Shilpi Sangshad. He directed three plays, "Charankabi Mukunda Das", "Sajahan" and "Charitraheen", but he did not act in these. Later, he acted in "Alibaba".

Hindi cinema
In 1956 Raj Kapoor wanted to cast Kumar in the Bengali version of Jagte Raho, but Kumar declined. In 1962, his friend, composer Hemant Kumar, offered him the lead role in a Hindi film titled Sharmili, directed by Biren Nag. Uttam Kumar was included in promotions for the film, but later cancelled for unknown reasons. Their relationship hit a low point after he rejected it. In 1964, Raj Kapoor approached him to appear in a film under his R.K Films banner, called Sangam, but Kumar rejected it, and the role went to Rajendra Kumar. 

Kumar's first Hindi film role was in Chhoti Si Mulaqat in 1967, directed by Alo Sarkar and produced by Kumar. The film was adapted from Kumar's earlier Bengali film, Agni Pariksha. Chhoti Si Mulaqat was a failure as the material was considered outdated and lost much of the original film's subtlety. Sarkar's second film starring Kumar, Bandi (1978), was also a failure. 

Kumar's only success in Hindi was Amanush. The film, directed by Shakti Samanta, was bilingual in both Bengali and Hindi. Kumar's appeared in another bilingual film directed by Samanta, Anand Ashram, a remake of the 1941 film Daktar, which starred Pankaj Mullick and Ahindra Choudhury.

Kumar's later Hindi films, Kitaab and Dooriyaan, were box-office failures.

Stardom
Although known as a romantic lead, Kumar had an eclectic range of performances.

In the 1960s, a rivalry was started between Kumar and Soumitra Chatterjee. In a 2014 interview, Chatterjee said, "I knew Uttamda ever since he was a Kolkata Port Trust employee before becoming a star. We had met at the theatre beforehand. Any talk about our rivalry is baseless as few know how caring he was. He once dragged me jogging to stay and look fit and trim as a hero at the crack of dawn. I woke up in the dawn hearing commotion in the lane outside and then he called me aloud. Waving to the crowd around the Austin we both got inside and drove away - to the lake area."

On-screen partnerships

Kumar and Suchitra Sen appeared together in many films. They first appeared as co-stars in Share Chuattor. The film was successful, and was followed by Agni Pariksha, Shilpi, Saptapadi, Pathe Holo Deri, Harano Sur, Chaowa Paowa, Bipasha, Jiban Trishna, Sagarika, Trijama, Indrani, Sabar Upare, Surjyo Toron, Rajlakshmi O Sreekanto, "Ekti Raat", "Grihadaha", Kamallata, Har Mana Har, and Alo Amar Alo. They had worked together in 30 films, of which 29 were box-office successes. In an interview Uttam Kumar once said about his chemistry between Suchitra Sen, "Roma saved my career, before Sharey Chuattor every heroine was older than me the so chemistry did not work properly, hence many of my films did not work flopped, then Roma came and I felt I got my heroine. If Roma never came I never would've been the Uttam Kumar."

Sonar Harin saw Supriya Devi play the lead opposite Kumar. As they began to act in more films together, the two got involved off-screen as well. In 1963, Uttam left his family home at Girish Mukherjee Road, Bhowanipur and stayed with Supriya for the next 17 years until his death. They starred together in several other films like Uttarayan, Chiradiner, Agni Sanskar, Suno Baranari, Kal Tumi Aleya, Lal Pathor, Andha Atit, Sudhu Ekti Bochhor, Mon Niye, Bilambita Loy, Bhola Maira, Sanyasi Raja, Bon Palashir Padabali, Sister, Jibon Mrityue, Bagh Bandir Khela.

Kumar worked in many films with the actress Sabitri Chatterjee. They first worked together in 1951 in the film Sahajatri. They worked in 39 films together, including Abak Prithibi, Bhranti Bilash, Uttarayon, Nishipadma, Mouchak, Dhanni Meye and others.

Radio controversy
Kumar was selected in 1976 to recite the Chandi Path in the All India Radio (AIR) studios. He was criticized by audience members for replacing the role normally served Birendra Krishna Bhadra. Kumar apologized and Bhadra was reinstated.

Philanthropy and activism
Kumar was active in the Indian independence movement. In 1945, he helped Subhas Chandra Bose's Indian National army relief fund, arranging a performance of the play Anandamath and giving the profit of 1700 rupees to Bose's elder brother Satish Chandra Bose. He also engaged in the Kolkata communal riots of 1946.

Uttam Kumar helped poor artists and technicians. 
In 1968, he left Abhinetri Sangha and founded his own foundation, Shilpi Sangshad, to help poor artists and technicians. He was president of this organization until his death. He worked in many films without any salary.

For the 1978 flood, he organized a charity cricket match between artists from the Bengali film industry and the Bombay film industry in 1979. He captained the Bengal team while Dilip Kumar captained the Bombay team.

Personal life
Kumar married Gauri Chatterjee (1929–1981) in 1941. They had a son named Gautam Chatterjee, born in 1950 and died 2003.  They had a troubled marriage.  
 

Many fans were inquisitive about the relationship between Uttam and Suchitra and thought they were together. Rumours arose that they were the reason Kumar had a divorce; however, there is no truth in that, they were both married and had families, and were respectful of each other as colleagues.

His grandson Gourab Chatterjee and his brother's grandson Sourav Banerjee are both actors.

Illness and death

His unexpected death was mourned by many people in Kolkata.

Filmography

Awards and recognition
National Film Award
1961: Certificate of Merit for Second Best Feature Film in Bengali – Saptapadi (As producer) 
1963: National Film Award for Best Feature Film in Bengali – Uttar Falguni ( As producer)

Legacy

Some of greatest actors and actresses such as Elizabeth Taylor, Dilip Kumar, Vyjayanthimala, Dharmendra, Rajesh Khanna, Shammi Kapoor and Amitabh Bachchan have expressed their admiration to him.

In 2009, Tollygunge Metro station in Kolkata was renamed as Mahanayak Uttam Kumar Metro Station in his honour. A life-size statue of Kumar has been erected near the station.

The Department of Post released a new postage stamp featuring the actor on September 3, 2009, celebrating the 83th anniversary of his birth.

In 2012, on the anniversary of his death, the Government of West Bengal created the "Mahanayak Samman" award named after Kumar, for lifetime achievement in film. Chief Minister Mamta Banerjee gave this award. This program is held on Uttam Mancha every year on his death anniversary.

In popular culture
In 2016 a television series based on his life was started, which was starring by the Bengali cinema actor Prosenjit Chatterjee named Mahanayak.
A biopic named Achena Uttam on his life is being made, where his character is played by the Bengali actor Saswata Chatterjee. 
National Award winner director Srijit Mukherjee made a film where he cast him through the VFX taken the footage of his 54 films the filmed named as Oti Uttam.

References

External links

 
 

Bengali male actors
Indian male film actors
Male actors from Kolkata
Male actors in Bengali cinema
Goenka College of Commerce and Business Administration alumni
University of Calcutta alumni
Best Actor National Film Award winners
1980 deaths
1926 births
20th-century Indian male actors